Amanda Thornborough (born 2 July 1990) is a Canadian rugby union player. She has represented  at the 2014 Women's Rugby World Cup. and 2017 Women's Rugby World Cup. She made her international debut in 2013 at the 2013 Nations Cup and played in the 2013 Hong Kong Sevens.

Thornborough first started playing rugby in high school in 2008 and continued at St. Francis Xavier University.

In 2017, she was invited to join the first ever Barbarians Women's team.

Other Sports

Squash 
Thornborough is an avid squash player and competes in an elite squash league in her current hometown of Victoria, British Columbia. Her playing style is a hybrid power-finesse style where she employs a devastating forehand straight shot along the wall on her returns while mixing in a conniving slice-drop shot, catching her opponents off guard. Her weaknesses include a mediocre serve and a troublesomely inconsistent backhand shot.

References

External links
 Rugby Canada Player Profile 

1990 births
Living people
Canadian female rugby union players
Canada women's international rugby union players
Female rugby sevens players
Sportspeople from Brandon, Manitoba